Thomas Gray, VC (17 May 1914 – 12 May 1940) was a British airman and a recipient of the Victoria Cross, the highest award for gallantry in the face of the enemy that can be awarded to British and Commonwealth forces.

RAF career
Gray was 25 years old, and a sergeant in No. 12 Squadron RAF, Royal Air Force (RAF) during the Second World War when the following deed took place for which he and his pilot Flying Officer Donald Garland were awarded the VC in a joint citation.

On 12 May 1940, over the Albert Canal, Belgium, one bridge in particular was being used by the invading German army, with protection from fighter aircraft, anti-aircraft and machine-guns. The RAF was ordered to demolish this vital bridge, and five Fairey Battle bombers were despatched with Sergeant Gray as the navigator in the plane leading the bombing attack. They met an inferno of anti-aircraft fire, but the mission was accomplished, much of the success being due to the coolness and resourcefulness of pilot Donald Garland of the leading aircraft and the navigation of Sergeant Gray. Only one aircraft made it back to base.

Gray is buried at the Heverlee War Cemetery near Leuven in Belgium.

Victoria Cross citation
The announcement and accompanying citation for Gray's VC was published in supplement to the London Gazette on 11 June 1940, reading:

Legacy
A Vickers VC-10 Serial 'XR807' of No. 101 Squadron was named 'Donald Garland VC & Thomas Gray VC'.

In 2005, to mark its 90th anniversary, No.12 Squadron RAF flew a Tornado GR4 with Flying Officer Garland's and Sergeant Gray's names painted under the cockpit as a mark of respect.

There is a monument on the bridge to the operation.

On the day of the attack on the bridge, Garland and his crew flew from the grass airfield near the village of Amifontaine, France, where No. 12 Squadron had been based since December 1939. No memorial to the airfield, and to the men who flew from it, has been reported to exist in the area.

References

External links

 Flying Officer D.E. Garland & Sergeant T. Grey in The Art of War exhibition at the UK National Archives
 

1914 births
1940 deaths
British World War II recipients of the Victoria Cross
Royal Air Force airmen
Burials at Heverlee Commonwealth War Graves Commission Cemetery
Royal Air Force personnel killed in World War II
Royal Air Force recipients of the Victoria Cross
People from Wiltshire
Aviators killed by being shot down
Military personnel from Wiltshire